The 1960–61 season was the 5th season of the Liga Española de Baloncesto. R. Madrid won their title.

Teams and venues

League table

Relegation playoffs

|}

Individual statistics

Points

References

ACB.com 
linguasport 

Liga Española de Baloncesto (1957–1983) seasons
1960–61 in Spanish basketball